Iryna Brémond was the defending champion, but chose not to participate.

Hsieh Su-wei won the title, defeating Zheng Saisai in the final, 6–3, 6–3.

Seeds

Main draw

Finals

Top half

Bottom half

References 
 Main draw

ITF Women's Circuit - Wenshan - Singles